Nordahl Leo Brue (born November 20, 1944) is a lawyer and entrepreneur, best known as a founder of Bruegger's Bagels.

Brue was educated at Grinnell College and Washington University in St. Louis. In 1983, Brue and Mike Dressell opened the first Bruegger's Bagels in Troy, New York. Today, Bruegger's runs approximately 300 bakery-cafes in 24 states and the District of Columbia. Brue also serves as a member of the Board of Trustees of Grinnell College, chair of PKC Corporation and Franklin Foods, and as a member of the board of the Green Mountain Power Corporation. He is a member of the Vermont State Governor's Council of Economic Advisors.

References 

1944 births
Living people
Fast casual chain founders
Washington University School of Law alumni
20th-century American businesspeople
21st-century American businesspeople
Grinnell College alumni